Robert Montgomery Presents is an American dramatic television series which was produced by NBC from January 30, 1950, until June 24, 1957. The live show had several sponsors during its eight-year run, and the title was altered to feature the sponsor, usually Lucky Strike cigarettes, for example, Robert Montgomery Presents Your Lucky Strike Theater, ....The Johnson's Wax Program, and so on.

Evolution

Initially offering hour-long dramas adapted from successful Hollywood films, the series was hosted and produced by Robert Montgomery. His presence lent a degree of respectability to the new medium of television, and he was able to persuade many of his Hollywood associates to appear. Montgomery introduced each episode and also acted in many episodes.

The program was noted for the high level of production values and the consistent attempt to present quality entertainment within the constraints of a live presentation. A drama built around the Hindenburg disaster, including interviews with survivors of the actual event, was one example of the ambitious nature of the program. In the 1950-1951 season, the series finished #11 in the Nielsen ratings, followed by finishing #26 in 1951-1952.

Productions

The debut episode was W. Somerset Maugham's The Letter, starring Madeleine Carroll in her television debut.  The broadcast raised concern with regard to how television rights to a story related to film rights to the same story. Warner Bros. produced the film The Letter (1940), and after the TV broadcast studio executives considered suing NBC and others connected with the program for copyright infringement.

During its first season, the movie adaptations included Rebecca, The Egg and I, Dark Victory and Montgomery's Ride the Pink Horse. Over the following seasons it adapted highly respected works but also showcased new writers and original dramas written expressly for the series. On Christmas Eve 1956, in a departure from its usual non-musical format, the series telecast Gian-Carlo Menotti's opera Amahl and the Night Visitors, which had already become an annual television event.

From 1952, a repertory cast appeared on the show along with guest artists (and featured during the series' Summer Theater seasons as well). Montgomery's daughter, Elizabeth Montgomery, made her acting debut as a repertory player in 1951 and remained with the show until 1956. Cliff Robertson also made his acting debut as part of the same group in 1954.

The announcer was Nelson Case.

On November 20, 1950, the program presented "The Canterville Ghost", starring Cecil Parker and Margaret O'Brien.

Guest stars
Notable guest stars included: 

Luther Adler 
Brian Aherne
Eddie Albert
Robert Alda
Mary Astor
Jean-Pierre Aumont
Jim Backus 
Fay Bainter 
Barbara Bel Geddes
Constance Bennett
Edna Best 
Claire Bloom 
Lee Bowman 
Ray Boyle
Lloyd Bridges 
Vanessa Brown 
James Cagney
Madeleine Carroll
John Cassavetes
Claudette Colbert
Jackie Cooper
Aneta Corsaut
Kathleen Crowley
Robert Culp
Robert Cummings 
James Dean
Gloria DeHaven
Joanne Dru
James Dunn
June Duprez
Bill Erwin
Tom Ewell
Peter Falk
Betty Field
Geraldine Fitzgerald
John Forsythe
Peggy Ann Garner
Dorothy Gish
Lillian Gish
Thomas Gomez
Farley Granger
Signe Hasso
Hurd Hatfield
June Havoc
Helen Hayes
Van Heflin
Wanda Hendrix
Charlton Heston
Kim Hunter
Diana Hyland
Louis Jourdan 
Boris Karloff
Grace Kelly
Phyllis Kirk
Elsa Lanchester
Angela Lansbury
Piper Laurie
Anna Lee
Jack Lemmon
Audra Lindley
June Lockhart
Paul Lukas
Diana Lynn
Jeffrey Lynn
Raymond Massey
Carole Mathews
Walter Matthau
Roddy McDowall
Darren McGavin
Dorothy McGuire
Burgess Meredith
Elizabeth Montgomery
Roger Moore
Chester Morris
Leslie Nielsen
David Niven
Margaret O'Brien
Una O'Connor
Gale Page
Geraldine Page
Vincent Price
Ella Raines
Lydia Reed
Lee Remick
Gena Rowlands
Ann Rutherford 
Reinhold Schünzel
Martha Scott
Zachary Scott
Alexis Smith
Kent Smith
Brett Somers 
Jean Stapleton
Inger Stevens
Grant Sullivan
Franchot Tone
Jo Van Fleet
Estelle Winwood
Joanne Woodward
Teresa Wright
Jane Wyatt
Gig Young

Awards and nominations

References

External links

Robert Montgomery Presents at CVTA with episode list

1950 American television series debuts
1957 American television series endings
1950s American anthology television series
1950s American drama television series
Black-and-white American television shows
English-language television shows
NBC original programming
Primetime Emmy Award for Outstanding Drama Series winners